Liucun Township is a township of Shenze County in southern Hebei province, China, located adjacent to and northwest of the county seat. , it has 15 villages under its administration:
Dongnanliu Village
Xinanliu Village
Dongbeiliu Village
Xibeiliu Village
Liuwangzhuang Village
Jiahe Village
Dajiazhuang Village
Lijiazhuang Village
Beizhaozhuang Village
Zhifang Village
Xineipu Village
Nanneipu Village
Beiyang Village
Yang Village
Jia Village

See also
List of township-level divisions of Hebei

References

Township-level divisions of Hebei
Shenze County